Kingdomtide is a liturgical season that is observed, albeit uncommonly, in the autumn by the United Methodist Church, in the United States, and some other Protestant denominations. The season of Kingdomtide was introduced in the early 20th century but has now fallen out of practice in the contemporary United Methodist Church.

History
Kingdomtide was a liturgical season or sub-season observed only by Protestant churches, especially Methodists and Presbyterians. Green was traditionally the color of the day throughout this season as it is a part of the season of Ordinary Time. In 1937, the US Federal Council of Churches (a predecessor of the National Council of Churches) recommended that the entire part of the Christian calendar between Pentecost and Advent be named Kingdomtide; however, two years later the Methodist Episcopal Church adopted the term only for the second half of this time period.

Precise criteria for determining when Kingdomtide began varied in different localities. The most common practice was to start the season on the Sunday on or nearest August 31, which gave Kingdomtide 13 Sundays every year; in some places, Kingdomtide began on the last Sunday in August, giving the season 13 Sundays in some years and 14 in others. The last Sunday before Advent begins is observed as the Feast of Christ the King.

The liturgy for Kingdomtide stressed charity and assistance to the poor, in contrast to the preceding Sundays after Pentecost, when a more spiritual mission was emphasized. Green vestments and paraments were used at church services during Kingdomtide, replacing the red used on the Sundays after Pentecost (in churches that did not recognize Kingdomtide as a separate season, green was generally deployed throughout the entire period between Pentecost and Advent).

By 1992, the United Methodist Church was the only denomination still using the term Kingdomtide, and even within the United Methodist Church the observance has almost completely ceased, with most congregations adopting the more common ecumenical pattern of a season of Ordinary Time between Pentecost and Advent.

Anglican Usage
In the Church of England, "the period between All Saints' Day and the First Sunday of Advent is observed as a time of celebration and reflection on the reign of Christ in earth and heaven". In the Church of England liturgical colours are recommended but not mandatory, so while red is encouraged during this period, individual churches may continue to use green until Advent. This period, called All Saints to Advent in the Church of England's liturgical material, is often nicknamed Kingdomtide or the Kingdom season.

References

Protestant holy days
United Methodist Church
Liturgical seasons